Pimelodus is a genus of fish in the family Pimelodidae native to Central and South America.

Species
There are currently 33 recognized species in this genus:
 Pimelodus absconditus Azpelicueta, 1995
 Pimelodus albicans (Valenciennes, 1840) 
 Pimelodus albofasciatus Mees, 1974
 Pimelodus altissimus C. H. Eigenmann & Pearson, 1942
 Pimelodus argenteus Perugia, 1891 
 Pimelodus atrobrunneus Vidal & C. A. S. de Lucena, 1999 
 Pimelodus blochii Valenciennes, 1840 
 Pimelodus britskii Garavello & Shibatta, 2007
 Pimelodus coprophagus L. P. Schultz, 1944
 Pimelodus fur (Lütken, 1874)
 Pimelodus garciabarrigai Dahl, 1961
 Pimelodus grosskopfii Steindachner, 1879
 Pimelodus halisodous F. R. V. Ribeiro, C. A. S. de Lucena & P. H. F. Lucinda, 2008
 Pimelodus jivaro C. H. Eigenmann & Pearson, 1942
 Pimelodus joannis F. R. V. Ribeiro, C. A. S. de Lucena & P. H. F. Lucinda, 2008
 Pimelodus luciae M. S. Rocha & F. R. V. Ribeiro, 2010 
 Pimelodus maculatus Lacépède, 1803
 Pimelodus microstoma Steindachner, 1877
 Pimelodus multicratifer F. R. V. Ribeiro, C. A. S. de Lucena & Oyakawa, 2011 
 Pimelodus mysteriosus Azpelicueta, 1998
 Pimelodus navarroi L. P. Schultz, 1944
 Pimelodus ornatus Kner, 1858
 Pimelodus ortmanni Haseman, 1911
 Pimelodus pantaneiro Souza-Filho & Shibatta, 2007
 Pimelodus paranaensis Britski & Langeani, 1988
 Pimelodus pictus Steindachner, 1876 
 Pimelodus pintado Azpelicueta, Lundberg & Loureiro, 2008
 Pimelodus platicirris Borodin, 1927
 Pimelodus pohli F. R. V. Ribeiro & C. A. S. de Lucena, 2006
 Pimelodus punctatus (Meek & Hildebrand, 1913)
 Pimelodus quadratus P. H. F. Lucinda, F. R. V. Ribeiro & C. A. S. de Lucena, 2016 
 Pimelodus stewarti F. R. V. Ribeiro, C. A. S. de Lucena & P. H. F. Lucinda, 2008
 Pimelodus tetramerus F. R. V. Ribeiro & C. A. S. de Lucena, 2006

References

 
Catfish genera
Freshwater fish genera
Pimelodidae
Taxa named by Bernard Germain de Lacépède